Network Orchestrator Companies are defined as:

The concept was born in the early 1990s among several organizational behavior researches that were conducted by many scholars of that time such as Malone & Crowston, Lipparini & Sobrero, Powell et al., Simonin, and many others. In 2001, the term "Network Orchestrator" was officially used by the authors Remo and Julian, after that several researches that followed used this nomination when referring to this structure of organizational relationship. 

A November 2014 Harvard Business Review article used the definition presented in proposing a new kind of business model, moving from the past standard of industrial classifications to a standard considering the principal way an organization invests its capital to generate and capture value. Their suggestion of a new kind of business model was constructed evaluating companies' descriptions of themselves in annual reports, revenues generated by different business units, capital allocation patterns such as R&D or COGS expenditure, and market perceptions including news articles and analyst reports.

Characteristics

Network Orchestrators Companies are considered as more profitable companies, which have a faster growth, higher return on assets, lower marginal costs and larger profit margins.

The authors also mentioned that as of 2013, Network Orchestrators Companies received valuations regarding their stock exchange shares or their value between two and four times higher, on average, than traditional companies. This reflects the calculations based on companies' market valuation and revenues, which are values difficult to manipulate with accounting, reflecting investor expectations for future cash flows.

This kind of companies shifted from physical to digital, enabling a digital platform in which people can congregate.

Competences

Network Orchestrators Companies' competences rely on:

Intangibles knowledge, for example companies as Gerson Lehrman Group, AlphaSights, Third Bridge or Coleman Research.
Relationships, for example companies as Facebook, Pinterest, or Instagram.
Assets required by people, for example Uber, Airbnb, TripAdvisor, Red Hat, Lyft, or Instacart.
New “non-management” and “non-ownership” competencies related to facilitating a network of individuals, their individual assets and relationships.

Intangible Assets

Barry Libert, Yoram (Jerry) Wind and Megan Beck also state that the Generally Accepted Accounting Principles (GAAP) usually categorize plant property and equipment as "assets" and all other costs such as people, trainings, and intellectual property as "others expenses", but this usual model does not include others important "assets" such as customers, sentiment, and networks relationships. This leads many companies to under-allocate capital to intangible assets. This situation brings advantages to Network Orchestrators Companies because intangible assets make up approximately 80% of corporate market value. Besides of that, Wharton University of Pennsylvania stated that:

Intangible assets dominate the current market with over 80% of its value, when by 1975 it consisted of only 17%, reflecting an obvious and significant change from tangible (physical) to intangible assets. Orban Mendoza Valiente stated that:

The evaluation of the intangibles are intuitive and are difficulty to measure, for example the building of the U.S. interstate highway took about 35 years and was estimated in $425 billion, Facebook instead grew up to 500 million users in a little more than six years, indicating that digital technology and networks made a significant difference in current business models.

References

Business models